The Peru Open, or Abierto de Perú, is the national open golf tournament of Peru. It was first played in 1982, although previous tournaments had previously been held using the same name. It was an event on the South American Tour from 1995 to 2000, and revived as a stop on the Tour de las Américas in 2004, when it was co-sanctioned by the European Challenge Tour, and 2008. It is currently an event on PGA Tour Latinoamérica.

Winners

Source:

Notes

References

External links
Coverage on the PGA Tour Latinoamérica's official site

PGA Tour Latinoamérica events
Former Challenge Tour events
Former Tour de las Américas events
Golf in Peru
Recurring sporting events established in 1953
1953 establishments in Peru